The Ex are an underground band from the Netherlands that formed in 1979 at the height of the original punk explosion. Initially known as an anarcho-punk band, they have since released over 20 full-length albums exploring a wide variety of genres, blending punk rock with free jazz and folk music from all over the world.

Biography

The Ex's music has undergone significant evolution over the years from their beginnings as a punk band. Founded by singer Jos Kley (better known as G.W. Sok), guitarist Terrie Hessels, drummer Geurt and bassist René, the band debuted with a song titled "Stupid Americans" on the Utreg-Punx vinyl 7" compilation released by Rock Against records in Rotterdam. The release of their first 7" All Corpses Smell the Same followed shortly after that, in 1980. Through the decades their music has gradually developed into its current form of highly intricate, experimental punk/post-punk/no wave-inspired work.

Expanding beyond punk rock, The Ex have incorporated a wide array of influences, often from non-Western and non-rock sources. Some include Hungarian and Turkish folk songs, and more recently music from Ethiopia, Congo and Eritrea (the independence song of Eritrea is covered by The Ex to kick off their 2004 album Turn). Other examples of branching out stylistically include the improvised double album Instant and a release under the moniker Ex Orkest, a 20 piece big band assembled for performances at Holland Festival.

Throughout the early 1980s The Ex went through many line-up changes before settling on the core quartet of G.W. Sok on vocals, Terrie on guitar, Luc on bass and Kat on drums. In the early 1990s, Andy Moor served double-duty with tourmates Dog Faced Hermans before becoming The Ex's permanent second guitarist in 1991. In 2003 Luc left the band after 19 years, to be replaced by double bassist Rozemarie Heggen. In 2005 Heggen in turn left the band and Colin (formerly of the Dog Faced Hermans) served as the band's bass player for recordings and tours with Ethiopian saxophone legend Getatchew Mekuria before becoming The Ex's sound board operator. Guitarists Andy Moor and Terrie Hessels have since filled in bass parts by switching off on baritone guitar.

The band has collaborated with many disparate artists, including UK anarchist band Chumbawamba (sometimes using the name Antidote), the Dog Faced Hermans (one former member, Andy Moor, has played guitar in The Ex since 1990), and with the late avant-garde cellist Tom Cora in the early 1990s, resulting in the album Scrabbling at the Lock (1991) and the follow-up And the Weathermen Shrug Their Shoulders (1993). The album In the Fishtank 5 (1999) was made with Chicago's Tortoise, and on In the Fishtank 9 (2001) they collaborated with members of Sonic Youth and the Dutch improvisers Instant Composers Pool Orchestra (ICP).

In 2009, after 30 years with the group, singer and co-founder G.W. Sok announced his departure from the band. Sok did so, believing he lacked sufficient enthusiasm to continue with the group, having decided to focus on writing and graphic design as well as singing in new musical projects with several other bands. His replacement is Arnold de Boer from the Dutch group Zea, with whom The Ex have toured and collaborated. In addition to singing, De Boer plays guitar and utilizes samples with The Ex.

The Ex is the subject of a documentary, Beautiful Frenzy (2004) by Christina Hallström and Mandra U. Wabäck, and the concert film Building a Broken Mousetrap (2006), directed by Jem Cohen. In 2008 the band was also featured in the film Roll Up Your Sleeves, directed by Dylan Haskins.

In 2011 The Ex were chosen by Caribou to perform at and co-curate the All Tomorrow's Parties music festival in Minehead, England.

Band members

Present
Terrie Hessels (also known as Terrie Ex) – guitar, baritone guitar (1979–present)
Katherina Bornefeld – drums, vocals, percussion (1984–present)
Andy Moor – guitar, baritone guitar (1990–present)
Arnold de Boer – vocals, guitar, samples (2009–present)

Former
G.W. Sok – vocals (1979–2009)
Geurt van Gisteren – drums (1979–1981)
René de Groot – bass (1979–1980)
Bas Masbeck – bass (1980–1983)
Wim ter Weele – drums (1981–1982)
Sabien Witteman – drums (1982–1984)
Luc Klaasen – bass (1983–2002)
Yoke Laarman – bass (1983–1985)
Johannes van de Weert – vocals (1986–1987)
Nicolette Schuurman – guitar (1987–1989)
Colin McLean – bass (1993–1994, 2005, 2012)
Han Buhrs – vocals (1995–1997)
Han Bennink – drums (1997)
Rozemarie Heggen – double bass (2003–2005)
Massimo Pupillo – bass (2005)

Timeline

Discography

Studio albums
Disturbing Domestic Peace (1980)
History Is What's Happening (1982)
Tumult (1983)
Dignity of Labour (1983)
Blueprints for a Blackout (1984)
Pokkeherrie (1985)
Aural Guerrilla (1988)
Joggers and Smoggers (1989)
Scrabbling at the Lock (1991)
And the Weathermen Shrug Their Shoulders (1993)
Instant (1995)
Mudbird Shivers (1995)
Starters Alternators (1998)
Dizzy Spells (2001)
Turn (2004)
Catch My Shoe (2011)
27 passports (2018)

References

Further reading 

 The Wire 232 and 362.

External links

Official band website
The Ex discography
.

1979 establishments in the Netherlands
Alternative Tentacles artists
Anarcho-punk groups
Dutch art rock groups
Dutch punk rock groups
Musical groups established in 1979
Musical groups from Amsterdam
Dutch post-punk music groups
20th-century squatters
Touch and Go Records artists
Homestead Records artists